Qween Amor (born 1988) is a performance artist who predominantly utilizes public space for her performances.

Amor seeks to "inspire more artists to go out and display their art in protest; it's a liberation movement to embrace one's own freedom".

Since 2013 Qween Amor has been performing in New York City.

Qween Amor reports going to court five times yearly to face charges for playing music too loud in the streets. Amor refuses to pay fines and always persuades the judge to dismiss charges. Amor has never been charged with indecent exposure.

In December 2012 Qween Amor was arrested while performing for a group of Black Hebrew Israelites in Washington DC.

Qween Amor frequently performs in a G-string, tutu, and Stiletto heel shoes. Amor uses s/he as a gender pronoun.

In May 2013 Qween Amor was assaulted and robbed during a performance.

Qween Amor currently resides in New Orleans, Louisiana.

References

External links
Qween Amor, a three-minute video documentary on Qween Amor. This is episode 3 of season 2 of the No Your City series.

Living people
American street performers
American erotic dancers
Dance in New York City
Non-binary artists
1989 births
Place of birth missing (living people)
Date of birth missing (living people)
LGBT Hispanic and Latino American people
Dancers from Louisiana
People from New Orleans